The Church of St. Theresa of the Infant Jesus is a Roman Catholic parish church under the authority of the Roman Catholic Archdiocese of New York, located at 2855 St. Theresa Avenue, Bronx, New York City. It was established in 1927.

The plans for the first church for this congregation was drawn up and built 1930 by architect Anthony J. DePace, a Bronx resident who designed many buildings for Catholic clients throughout the Northeastern United States. When the church was destroyed by fire around 1970 it was rebuilt in a modern style by DePace.

The parish also has a school, which was originally run by the Dominican Sisters of Sparkill. Principals included: Sr. Mary Bernard, OP, Sr. Theresa Francis, OP, Elaine F. Ludwig, Anne Gevlin and Josephine Fannelli.

References 

Christian organizations established in 1927
Roman Catholic churches in the Bronx
Anthony J. DePace church buildings
Demolished churches in New York City
Demolished buildings and structures in the Bronx
Roman Catholic churches completed in 1930
Roman Catholic churches completed in 1970
20th-century Roman Catholic church buildings in the United States